Nexus Mods is a site which allows users to upload and download "mods" (modifications) for computer games. It acts as a source for the distribution of original content. It is one of the largest gaming modification websites on the web, and, as of January 2022, had thirty million registered members. Founded in 2001 as a fan site, Nexus Mods was modified into the website TESSsource in 2007. After that, the site has expanded to host mod files for many other modifiable PC games. As of June 2022, the Nexus Mods network supported 1733 games, with a single forum and a wiki for site- and mod-related topics. The website's hosting and publication of various mods has been covered in the gaming and computer press.

History
Nexus Mods was founded by Robin Scott and a friend in August 2001 as a fan site for the Bethesda Softworks game The Elder Scrolls III: Morrowind under the name "Morrowind Chronicles". After the success of Morrowind Chronicles, Scott and the friend he was working alongside founded a company by the name of GamingSource and created the website TESSource, which allowed users to upload their modifications and content for games in The Elder Scrolls video game series. Scott soon became tired with the revenue of the websites being split when he was operating the websites by himself, and made the decision to break away from TESSource in 2007 and founded his own website under the name of TESNexus. Scott made use of the TESSource website with his new venture. This resulted in more than 200 additional games being supported by early 2017.

Scott indicated in 2013 that the Nexus sites would remain free of corporate investment in the foreseeable future, also avoiding direct ads. Revenue instead came from premium memberships, with the site otherwise free.

In December 2015, the website reported a possible security breach of account names, and recommended that its members change their passwords.

Financial information was not breached, as the website uses PayPal for all transactions.

In 2016, following an extensive survey of existing users, the website received its biggest redesign to date. The redesign saw the introduction of a responsive viewport allowing seamless browsing on a mobile device, an intuitive navigation bar and the ability to pin games to the user's profile. 

As of April 2021, Nexus Mods has a reported 26 million members. As of 2021, Nexus Mods is the largest gaming modification site on the internet, ranking at #1090 in the Alexa Rankings, with over 4.5 billion downloads since its initial launch.

In June 2021, in a series of announcements in Nexus's developer forums followed by a lengthy public announcement on July 1, Nexus Mods stated that they would no longer be deleting mods at mod authors' request, but instead retaining archival copies for use in a new Collections feature. The initial announcements sparked complaints by numerous mod authors, causing Nexus to allow a one-month grace period for mod authors to either accede to the policy change or pull all of their mods from the site. The response by mod-authors has been mixed, with some announcing that they would be pulling or ceasing support for their mods, while others supported the move.

In August 2022, an alleged sockpuppet troll account who went by the alias "Mike Hawk" uploaded a texture modification for the Windows release of Marvel's Spider-Man called "Non-Newtonian New York" replacing the rainbow flag with the flag of the United States, with the description "changes the stupid pride flags with american flags" in an apparent effort to sow controversy. The modification was removed by Nexus Mods moderators shortly after, but not without garnering controversy from some users who were displeased with the ban; the site later went on to state that "we are for inclusivity, we are for diversity. If we think someone is uploading a mod on our site with the intent to deliberately be against inclusivity and/or diversity then we will take action against it," also frankly advising users who disagreed with the ban to "move on". A similar announcement was also made by ModDB when a Twitter user informed the site that the flag modification was also mirrored on ModDB, which the site's moderators promptly removed.

Notable mods
Mods hosted on the site can change games in a number of ways, from adding a first-person perspective to adding fully developed worldspaces with voice-acted quests. Mods for The Witcher have been built for improving immersion, and Nexus Mods is highly noted for its support of the game The Elder Scrolls V: Skyrim and is often regarded as the largest website supporting modifications for games in The Elder Scrolls series of games, with sites like PC Gamer and Kotaku referencing Nexus in multiple articles regarding modifications for The Elder Scrolls series.

The website's hosting and publication of various mods has been covered in the gaming and computer press. In 2016, Forbes praised the "Alternate Start - Live Another Life" mod posted to Nexus for The Elder Scrolls V: Skyrim - Special Edition in a feature article. In January 2017, a Fallout 4 mod on Nexus Mods was covered in the Daily Express, with other Fallout 4 mods reported on by WWG, Paste Magazine, the Christian Times, and PC Gamer.

Website

Features
Nexus Mods requires users to register before uploading any files or downloading files over a certain size. User accounts integrate across all of the available sites, meaning a user only needs one account to make use of all of the Nexus websites. Each account and file page is also integrated with the Nexus Forums.

The website gives users the ability to:
 Upload files to their modification's webpage
 Create and display an information page about their modification
 Upload images of their modification
 Comment on file pages
 Browse categories to find modifications for their games
 Search for a specific modification for their games
 
In June 2016, wide-ranging theft of NexusMods mods for other corporate mod websites was noted in the press, with Nexus owner Robin Scott (Dark0ne) criticizing Bethesda's lack of response to the issue. That month, Nexus added an extra permissions system to the website so stolen mods on other websites were easier to see. Although there was already an extensive permissions system for mods, the addition to the system for console modding allowed users to select what their intent for the mod was in terms of use, and where they would allow it to be available. It also allowed "console players to search the Nexus system for mods they can find via their console's Bethesda.net browser if they like the look of them."

Supported games
The Nexus Mods network supported 1733 games as of June 2022, and features a single forum and a wiki for site and mod-related topics. The main Nexus Mods web page lists the various games for which mods are available, along with the number of files, authors and downloads. Games with the most mods hosted were:

Nexus Mod Manager
Nexus Mod Manager (NMM) is an open-source program associated with Nexus Mods. Available only for Microsoft Windows, it automates the download and installation of mods for 30+ games as of May 2022, among them The Elder Scrolls V: Skyrim and Fallout 3. Advantages of using NMM over manual mod installation include easy organization, installation, and uninstallation of mods. According to the Nexus site, NMM "integrates with the Nexus sites to provide you with a fast, efficient, and much less hassled modding experience."

Nexus Mods has since replaced Nexus Mod Manager with Vortex, the official Nexus Mods mod manager with improved mod handling and a more modern interface.

Nexus Mod Manager is still maintained by the same developer with the help of the community and it is now called NMM Community Edition.

See also
Mod DB
List of video game websites
Steam Workshop
User-generated content

References

External links

NMM Community Edition
Vortex

Internet properties established in 2001
Internet properties established in 2007
Video game mods
Video game websites
User-generated content